Omiodes seminitidalis is a moth in the family Crambidae. It was described by Schaus in 1912. It is found in Costa Rica.

References

Moths described in 1912
seminitidalis